Subdialect (from Latin , "under", and Ancient Greek , "discourse") is a linguistic term designating a dialectological category between the levels of dialect and idiolect. Subdialects are basic subdivisions of a dialect. Subdialects can be divided further, ultimately down to idiolects. Normally subdialects of one dialect are quite close to each other, differing mainly in pronunciation and certain local words.

See also 

 Accent (dialect)
 Variety (linguistics)
 Language cluster
 Dubrovnik subdialect
 Laško subdialect
 Lwów subdialect
 Supradialect

Reference

Literature 

 Joseph R. Applegate, "Phonological Rules of a Subdialect of English", Word, vol. 17/2 (1961), p. 186-193.
 Asta Leskauskaite, "The Periphery Subdialects of Southwestern Lithuania and the Slavic Languages", Acta Baltico-Slavica, 30 (2006), p. 391-402. 

Dialects
Language varieties and styles